Forest Glen is a side platformed Washington Metro station in Forest Glen, Maryland, United States. The station was opened on September 22, 1990, and is operated by the Washington Metropolitan Area Transit Authority (WMATA). Providing service for the Red Line, the station is located at Georgia Avenue (Maryland Route 97) and Forest Glen Road.

History

The original plan was to build the station above ground, with a parking lot that would have required demolishing about fifteen homes. After community opposition to the above-ground station, Montgomery County approved a modified plan for an underground station.

The originally planned location for the parking lot and bus stops was on the east side of Georgia Avenue, between Sherwood Road and Tilton Drive, near Woodland Drive. Tilton Drive would have been closed between Georgia Avenue and Woodland Drive in order to reduce traffic through the nearby residential neighborhood. Building the parking lot and bus stops there would have required the demolition of one business and several homes.

Response to plans for the underground station were mixed, with some residents and local businesses looking forward to the convenience of a nearby station and other residents concerned about potential increases in traffic in the area. Metro contended that deleting the station from the plans altogether would have overloaded both Wheaton and Silver Spring metro stations. The Montgomery County council approved the station in January 1976, three months after it had approved the further-away Wheaton station.

On August 13th, 1991, all six elevators broke down due to a malfunctioning fire sensor, blocking access to and from the station for several hours.

Layout
Building the tunnels through soft rock close to the surface would have been either very costly or impossible, so engineers decided to dig the tunnels through harder, more solid rock deeper in the ground. Because of the lack of escalators, Forest Glen is the only station equipped with smoke doors to protect customers during a train fire and evacuation. In addition, a 20-story staircase exists for emergency use. South of this station, trains emerge from the tunnel.

This station, along with Wheaton station farther north, has separate tunnels and platforms for each direction, instead of the large, vaulted common room seen at most other underground stations in the Metro system; this design, which is similar to many of the London Underground's tube stations, was used to save money due to the station's depth.

References

External links 

 Forest Glen Road entrance from Google Maps Street View

Forest Glen, Maryland
1990 establishments in Maryland
Stations on the Red Line (Washington Metro)
Railway stations in the United States opened in 1990
Railway stations located underground in Maryland
Washington Metro stations in Maryland